Bursadopsis is a genus of moths in the family Geometridae.

Species
 Bursadopsis praeflavata Warren, 1899

References
 Bursadopsis at Markku Savela's Lepidoptera and Some Other Life Forms
Natural History Museum Lepidoptera genus database

Ennominae